Live aus Berlin ("Live from Berlin") is a recording of a concert by the German Neue Deutsche Härte band Rammstein, performed in 1998 and released a year later. It has been released in several formats:

 CD (15 tracks)
 2 CD Limited Edition (18 tracks + multimedia content)
 Censored VHS/DVD (Without Bück dich)
 Uncensored VHS (With Bück dich)
 Uncensored DVD, released in 2020 
The performance of "Bück dich" ("Bend down", "Bend over") is controversial. The mimed portrayal of anal sex using a water-squirting dildo led to the video being given an 18 certificate in Europe. The first DVD release of the concert does not include the performance, although it is included on the VHS and CD releases and the 2020 reissue of the DVD.

Track listing

 Audio cassette version is available (Side A = 1-8; B = 9-15)
 Some editions contains a hidden track in the pregap, rewind about 58 seconds before track 1.

Limited edition

Video

The DVD version also contains a subtitled 1997 interview, with the band's members, discussing Rammstein in general, and a multi-angle area featuring Tier, Du hast, and Rammstein. There is also a 2-stage quiz accessible through PCs.

Easter eggs
When accessing the number pad feature at the Menu of the DVD and entering '23' anywhere in the main menu, the music video Stripped will play. The song is a cover of the Depeche Mode song and is also featured as a bonus track on Rammstein's second album Sehnsucht.
After winning the second part of the quiz, a weblink and secret password is given in order to download a Rammstein screensaver.  The webpage is no longer available.

Charts

Weekly charts

Year-end charts

Certifications

Personnel
Till Lindemann – vocals
Richard Kruspe – electric guitars, acoustic guitar on "Wilder Wein", backing vocals, additional keyboards on "Bück dich"
Paul Landers – electric guitars, acoustic guitar on "Wilder Wein", backing vocals
Oliver Riedel – bass guitar, acoustic guitar on "Wilder Wein", backing vocals on "Sehnsucht" and "Bück dich"
Christoph Schneider – drums, additional keyboards on "Wilder Wein"
Christian Lorenz – keyboards

Notes

References

Rammstein albums
1999 live albums
1999 video albums
German-language albums
Live video albums
Universal Music Group live albums
Universal Music Group video albums